Pollenia ibalia is a species of cluster fly in the family Polleniidae.

Distribution 
Morocco. Introduced to Alaska.

References 

Polleniidae
Insects described in 1930
Diptera of Africa